Anton Stepanovich Bulin (Russian: Антон Степанович Булин; 10 January 1894 – 29 July 1938) was a Russian revolutionary, Soviet political officer and military commander. A member of the Bolshevik Party since 1914, he participated in the Civil War against the White movement and in the wars against Finland and Poland.

He was a recipient of the Order of the Red Banner. Bulin was a candidate member of the Central Committee elected by the 17th Congress of the All-Union Communist Party (Bolsheviks) from 1934 until 12 October 1937. During the Great Purge, on 8 December 1937, he was arrested by the NKVD and expelled from the All-Union Communist Party (Bolsheviks). His expulsion was confirmed on 20 January 1938 and he was executed later that year. Bulin was rehabilitated in 1955.

References

1894 births
1938 deaths
Great Purge victims from Russia
People executed by the Soviet Union
Soviet military personnel of the Russian Civil War
People of the Polish–Soviet War
Recipients of the Order of the Red Banner
Soviet rehabilitations
Old Bolsheviks
Central Committee of the Communist Party of the Soviet Union members
Central Committee of the Communist Party of the Soviet Union candidate members